Seanach Garbh (died 620) was Abbot of Clonfert.

Seanach is the second recorded abbot, including Brendan. Few details of his life appear to be known, and over one hundred years would pass before another abbot was recorded. Events during his lifetime included:

 577 - Battle of Deorham
 578 - foundation of Kongo Gumi
 580 - Fearghus Scannal, King of Munster, was slain.
 582 - Fearadhach, son of Duach, Lord of Osraighe, was slain by his own people.
 585 - Famine in Gaul
 597 - Brenainn mac Cairbre dies.
 605 - Molua, i.e. Lughaidh Mac hUi Oiche, first abbot of Cluain Fearta Molua, died.
 611 - The church of Beannchair Uladh was burned.
 612 - The devastation of Torach by a marine fleet.
 617 - The battle of Ceann Gubha

References
 Annals of Ulster at CELT: Corpus of Electronic Texts at University College Cork
 Annals of Tigernach at CELT: Corpus of Electronic Texts at University College Cork
Revised edition of McCarthy's synchronisms at Trinity College Dublin.
 Byrne, Francis John (2001), Irish Kings and High-Kings, Dublin: Four Courts Press, 
 Lysaght, Eamonn (1978), The Surnames of Ireland. , pp. 233–34.

Christian clergy from County Galway
7th-century Irish abbots
620 deaths
Year of birth unknown